TNA British Boot Camp is a British reality television programme focusing on the professional wrestling industry. The programme documented the careers of four British professional wrestlers seeking a contract with the American professional wrestling promotion Total Nonstop Action Wrestling (TNA). The series was commissioned from TNA Productions by Sky UK and started airing on Challenge from 1 January 2013.

TNA British Boot Camp was both the first non-game show commissioned for Challenge by BSkyB and the first American professional wrestling programme exclusively created and broadcast for the British market. The commissioning of the series reflected a commitment by BSkyB to invest £600 million in British-made television content by 2014.  The programme's executive producer is veteran TNA ring announcer Jeremy Borash, who created the show and edited the programme himself.

Season 1

Synopsis
The programme followed "four of Britain's most promising wrestlers" - Rockstar Spud, Marty Scurll and The Blossom Twins - who competed to receive a contract from TNA. The wrestlers were mentored by veteran professional wrestlers such as Hulk Hogan and Rollerball Rocco.

In the season finale of British Boot Camp, which aired on 22 January 2013, Rockstar Spud was named the winner, receiving a contract with TNA. Following the finale, all four wrestlers performed with TNA as part of the "Road to Lockdown" tour of the United Kingdom and Ireland.

Cast

Contestants
 Hannah Blossom
 Holly Blossom
 Marty Scurll
 Rockstar Spud (Winner)

Mentors
 Al Snow
 Doug Williams
 Rollerball Rocco

Other wrestling personalities
 Dixie Carter
 Hulk Hogan
 James Storm
 Kurt Angle
 Magnus
 Jeremy Borash

Production
TNA announced on 5 September 2012 that it had completed filming of TNA Wrestling: British Boot Camp. The series was originally scheduled to air in December 2012, but was moved back to January 2013.

Reception
The programme was described as "a ratings hit for Challenge TV". Rob Leigh of the Daily Mirror stated that "the show's post-reality show format is bang up to date".

Season 2

Synopsis
The programme followed "twelve of Britain's most promising wrestlers" who competed to receive a contract from TNA. It premiered on Challenge, on 19 October 2014.

Cast

Contestants

Mentors
 Al Snow
 Gail Kim
 Samoa Joe

Other wrestling personalities
 Jeremy Borash
 Rockstar Spud

See also

Professional wrestling in the United Kingdom
TNA Gut Check
WWE Diva Search
WWE Tough Enough

References

External links

2013 British television series debuts
2014 British television series endings
British reality television series
English-language television shows
Professional wrestling in the United Kingdom
Sky UK original programming
Impact Wrestling television shows